The Sōtetsu Shin-Yokohama Line is a commuter line operated by Sotetsu between Nishiya Station on the Sōtetsu Main Line to Shin-Yokohama Station. Sōtetsu has put its company names as a formal part of the line names, which is a first for the company.

It is a part of the Eastern Kanagawa Line railway strategic plan for improving the rail network connectivity of Kanagawa Prefecture. The rail infrastructures of this line are maintained by the Japan Railway Construction, Transport and Technology Agency (JRTT). Sōtetsu collects the operation revenue and pays JRTT for using the rail infrastructures, then JRTT use this payment to maintain the infrastructures and reimburse the loan for the construction of this line.

The Sōtetsu Shin-Yokohama Line opened on 30 November 2019 and the extension to Shin-Yokohama opened on 18 March 2023.

Summary 
Sōtetsu Main Line and Sōtetsu Izumino Line trains operates through services with JR East via Hazawa Yokohama Kokudai; and planned through service with Tōkyū, Toei Subway Lines via Hiyoshi. The former is named the Sōtetsu JR Link Line. Moreover, Sōtetsu has been promoting the project as the "Metropolitan Direct Linkage Project" (都心直通プロジェクト), as the link will enable connection from eastern Kanagawa into central Tokyo, and further north towards Saitama.

The new facilities at Shin-Yokohama Station are jointly operated by Sōtetsu and Tōkyū. This is the first case for both operators to have a station with direct connections to the Shinkansen.

Routes and services

Through service to/from Tōkyū 
Tōkyū through service trains will enter the Tōkyū Line network from Shin-Yokohama, and continue towards Shibuya via the Tōkyū Tōyoko Line or Meguro via Tōkyū Meguro Line.

Regarding the Tōyoko Line, beyond Shin-Yokohama and Nishiya, Tōyoko line trains will run express service along the Izumino Line to  station.

Regarding the Meguro Line, once connected to the Sōtetsu network at Shin-Yokohama, Meguro line trains will run express along the Main Line to  station.

Sōtetsu has introduced its 20000 series which is to be used in Tōkyū through services, and has been in service since February 2018. The 20000 series will be produced in 10-car sets and 8-cars, with the 10-car sets not entering the Tōkyū Meguro Line and the Toei Mita Line. Moreover, the 20000 series is not intended to be used on JR through services.

The station numbers for the Sōtetsu Shin-Yokohama Line's Shin-Yokohama station was revealed on 16 September 2022.

As of November 2022, various trainsets from Sōtetsu, Tōkyū, Tokyo Metro, Toei, and Tōbu have been conducting tests along the now completed segment of this line and the Tōkyū Shin-Yokohama Line between Hiyoshi and Hazawa Yokohama-Kokudai.

On 16 December 2022, Sōtetsu, Tōkyū, and the Japan Railway Construction, Transport and Technology Agency announced that the Sōtetsu Shin-Yokohama Line's extension to Shin-Yokohama will open on 18 March 2023. The Shin-Yokohama Line opened as scheduled on 18 March 2023, providing through service between Shin-Yokohama and Hiyoshi.

Station list 
 All stations are located in Yokohama, Kanagawa Prefecture

Rolling stock 
JR East E233-7000 series 10-car trains
Sotetsu 12000 series 10-car trains
Sotetsu 20000 series 10-car trains
Sotetsu 21000 series 8-car trains
Tokyu 5050 series 8-car trains
Tokyu 5050-4000 series 10-car trains
Tokyu 5080 series 8-car trains
Tokyu 3000 series 8-car trains

References

External links 
 Opening date official press release (in Japanese)

Lines of Sagami Railway
Railway lines in Kanagawa Prefecture
1067 mm gauge railways in Japan
Railway lines opened in 2019
2019 establishments in Japan